The Communauté de communes de la GERBE is a former federation of municipalities (communauté de communes) in the Seine-et-Marne département and in the Île-de-France région of France. It was created in December 1993. It was merged into the Communauté de communes du Provinois in April 2013.

GERBE is an acronym for: Guilde Economique Rurale de la Brie Est (Rural Economic Guild of Eastern Brie); it is also the French word for "sheaf (of corn)".

Composition 
The Communauté de communes comprised the following communes:

La Chapelle-Saint-Sulpice
Chenoise
Cucharmoy
Longueville
Mortery
Poigny
Rouilly
Saint-Hilliers
Saint-Loup-de-Naud

See also
Communes of the Seine-et-Marne department

References 

Former commune communities of Seine-et-Marne